Florence Villa is a neighborhood within the city limits of Tampa, Florida. The ZIP Codes serving the neighborhood are 33605 and 33619. The neighborhood is part of the East Tampa region and is located within District Five of the Tampa City Council.

Geography
Florence Villa boundaries are Uceta Yard to the south, Grant Park to the north, East Lake-Orient Park to the east, and Highland Pines to the west.

Subdistricts
Florence Villa consists of two subdistricts, which are Oak Park  and Beasley.

See also
Neighborhoods in Tampa, Florida

References

External links
Information page from the City of Tampa
List of Tampa neighborhoods

Neighborhoods in Tampa, Florida